People for the Ethical Treatment of Animals (PETA; , stylized as P𝑒TA) is an American animal rights nonprofit organization based in Norfolk, Virginia, and led by Ingrid Newkirk, its international president. PETA reports that PETA entities have more than 9 million members globally.

Founded in March 1980 by Newkirk and animal rights activist Alex Pacheco, the organization first caught the public's attention in the summer of 1981 during what became known as the Silver Spring monkeys case. The organization opposes factory farming, fur farming, animal testing, and other activities it considers to be exploitation of animals.

History

Ingrid Newkirk

Ingrid Newkirk was born in England in 1949, and raised in Hertfordshire and later New Delhi, India, where her father—a navigational engineer—was stationed. Newkirk, now an atheist, was educated in a convent, the only British girl there. She moved to the United States as a teenager, first studying to become a stockbroker, but after taking some abandoned kittens to an animal shelter in 1969 and being appalled by the conditions that she found there, she chose a career in animal protection instead. She became an animal-protection officer for Montgomery County, Maryland, and then the District of Columbia's first woman poundmaster. By 1976 she was head of the animal disease control division of D.C.'s Commission on Public Health and in 1980 was among those named as "Washingtonians of the Year."

In 1980, after her divorce, she met Alex Pacheco, a political science major at George Washington University. He volunteered at the shelter where she worked, and they fell in love and began living together. Newkirk read Peter Singer's influential book, Animal Liberation (1975), and in March 1980, she persuaded Pacheco to join her in forming People for the Ethical Treatment of Animals, at that point just "five people in a basement," as Newkirk described it. They were mostly students and members of the local vegetarian society, but the group included a friend of Pacheco's from the UK, Kim Stallwood, a British activist who went on to become the national organizer of the British Union for the Abolition of Vivisection.

Silver Spring monkeys

The group first came to public attention in 1981 during the Silver Spring monkeys case, a dispute about experiments conducted by researcher Edward Taub on 17 macaque monkeys inside the Institute of Behavioral Research in Silver Spring, Maryland. The case led to the first police raid in the United States on an animal laboratory, triggered an amendment in 1985 to the United States Animal Welfare Act, and became the first animal-testing case to be appealed to the United States Supreme Court, which upheld a Louisiana State Court ruling that denied PETA's request for custody of the monkeys.

Pacheco had taken a job in May 1981 inside a primate research laboratory at the institute, intending to gain firsthand experience of working inside an animal laboratory. Taub had been cutting sensory ganglia that supplied nerves to the monkeys' fingers, hands, arms, and legs—a process called "deafferentation"—so that the monkeys could not feel them; some of the monkeys had had their entire spinal columns deafferented. He then used restraint, electric shock, and withholding of food and water to force the monkeys to use the deafferented parts of their bodies. The research led in part to the discovery of neuroplasticity and a new therapy for stroke victims called constraint-induced movement therapy.

Pacheco went to the laboratory at night, taking photographs that showed the monkeys living in what the Institute for Laboratory Animal Research's ILAR Journal called "filthy conditions." He passed his photographs to the police, who raided the lab and arrested Taub. Taub was convicted of six counts of cruelty to animals, the first such conviction in the United States of an animal researcher; the conviction, though, was overturned on appeal. Norm Phelps writes that the case followed the highly publicized campaign of Henry Spira in 1976 against experiments on cats being performed at the American Museum of Natural History in New York and Spira's subsequent campaign in April 1980 against the Draize test. These and the Silver Spring monkey case jointly put animal rights on the agenda in the United States.

The 10-year battle for custody of the monkeys—described by The Washington Post as a vicious mud fight, during which both sides accused the other of lies and distortion— transformed PETA into a national, then international, movement. By February 1991, it claimed over 350,000 supporters, a paid staff of over 100, and an annual budget of over $7 million.

Locations
PETA was based in Rockville, Maryland, until 1996, when it moved to Norfolk, Virginia. It opened a Los Angeles division in 2006 and also has offices in Washington, D.C., and Oakland, California. In addition, PETA has international affiliates.

Philosophy and activism

Profile
PETA is an animal rights organization that opposes speciesism, and the abuse of animals in any way, such as for food, clothing, entertainment, or research.  The group has been criticized by some animal rights advocates for its willingness to work with industries that use animals for the purpose of affecting gradual change. Newkirk rejects this criticism and has said the group exists to hold the radical line.

PETA has been criticized for their policy of euthanasing almost all animals that come into their Virginia shelter.

In 2020, PETA's website claimed they had 6.5 million supporters, and received donations of $49 million for 2019.

Campaigns and consumer boycotts

The organization is known for aggressive media stunts, combined with a solid base of celebrity support—in addition to its honorary directors, Paul McCartney, Alicia Silverstone, Eva Mendes, Charlize Theron, Ellen DeGeneres, and many other notable celebrities have appeared in PETA ads. Every week, Newkirk holds what The New Yorker calls a "war council," with two dozen of her top strategists gathered at a square table in the PETA conference room, with no suggestion considered too "kooky or unkind". PETA also gives an annual prize, called the Proggy Award (for "progress"), to individuals or organizations dedicated to animal welfare or who distinguish themselves through their efforts within the area of animal welfare.

Many of the campaigns have focused on large corporations. Fast food companies such as KFC, Wendy's, and Burger King have been targeted. In the animal-testing industry, PETA's consumer boycotts have focused on Avon, Benetton, Bristol-Myers-Squibb, Chesebrough-Pond's, Dow Chemical, General Motors, and others. The group's modus operandi includes buying shares in target companies such as McDonald's and Kraft Foods to exert influence. The campaigns have delivered results for PETA. McDonald's and Wendy's introduced vegetarian options after PETA targeted them; and Polo Ralph Lauren said it would no longer use fur. Avon, Estée Lauder, Benetton, and Tonka Toy Co. all stopped testing products on animals, the Pentagon stopped shooting pigs and goats in wounds tests, and a slaughterhouse in Texas was closed down.

As part of its anti-fur action, PETA supporters have infiltrated hundreds of fashion shows in the U.S. and Europe and one in China, throwing red paint on the catwalks and unfurling banners. Celebrities and supermodels have posed naked for the group's "I'd Rather Go Naked Than Wear Fur" campaign—some men, but mostly women—triggering criticism from some feminist animal rights advocates. The New Yorker writes that PETA activists have crawled through the streets of Paris wearing leg-hold traps and thrown around money soaked in fake blood at the International Fur Fair. They sometimes engage in pie-throwing—in January 2010, Canadian MP Gerry Byrne compared them to terrorists for throwing a tofu cream pie at Canada's fishery minister Gail Shea in protest of the seal slaughter, a comment Newkirk called a silly chest-beating exercise. "The thing is, we make them gawk," she told Satya magazine, "maybe like a traffic accident that you have to look at."

PETA has also objected to the practice of mulesing (removing strips of wool-bearing skin from around the buttocks of a sheep). In October 2004, PETA launched a boycott against the Australian wool industry, leading some clothing retailers to ban products using Australian wool from their stores. In response, the Australian wool industry sued PETA, arguing among other things that mulesing prevents flystrike, a very painful disease that can affect sheep. A settlement was reached, and PETA agreed to stop the boycott, while the wool industry agreed to seek alternatives to mulesing.

In 2011, PETA named five orcas as plaintiffs and sued SeaWorld over the animals' captivity, seeking their protection under the Thirteenth Amendment. A federal judge heard the case and dismissed it in early 2012. In August 2014, SeaWorld announced it was building new orca tanks that would almost double the size of the existing ones to provide more space for its whales. PETA responded that a "larger prison is still a prison." In 2016, SeaWorld admitted that it had been sending its employees to pose as activists to spy on PETA. Following an investigation by an outside law firm, SeaWorld's Board of Directors directed management to end the practice.

In 2011, Patricia de Leon was the Hispanic spokesperson for PETA's anti-bullfighting campaign.

Some campaigns have been particularly controversial. Newkirk was criticized in 2003 for sending a letter to PLO leader Yasser Arafat asking him to keep animals out of the conflict, after a donkey was blown up during an attack in Jerusalem. The group's 2003 "Holocaust on your Plate" exhibition—eight  panels juxtaposing images of Holocaust victims with animal carcasses and animals being transported to slaughter—was criticized by the Anti-Defamation League, which said, "the effort by Peta to compare the deliberate systematic murder of millions of Jews to the issue of animal rights is abhorrent" and "[r]ather than deepen our revulsion against what the Nazis did to the Jews, the project will undermine the struggle to understand the Holocaust and to find a way to make sure such catastrophes never happen again." In July 2010, the German Federal Constitutional Court ruled that PETA's campaign was not protected by free speech laws and banned it within Germany as an offense against human dignity. The exhibit, however, had been funded by an anonymous Jewish philanthropist and created by Matt Prescott, who lost several relatives in the Holocaust. Prescott said: "The very same mindset that made the Holocaust possible—that we can do anything we want to those we decide are 'different or inferior'—is what allows us to commit atrocities against animals every single day. ... The fact is, all animals feel pain, fear and loneliness. We're asking people to recognize that what Jews and others went through in the Holocaust is what animals go through every day in factory farms." Analogies between animal rights and the Holocaust had been initiated by the prominent Jewish author Isaac Bashevis Singer. In 2005, the NAACP criticized the "Are Animals the New Slaves?" exhibit, which showed images of African-American slaves, Native Americans, child laborers, and women, alongside chained elephants and slaughtered cows.

PETA's "It's still going on" campaign features newspaper ads comparing widely publicized murder-cannibalization cases to the deaths of animals in slaughterhouses. The campaign has attracted significant media attention, controversy and generated angry responses from the victims' family members. Ads were released in 1991 describing the deaths of the victims of serial killer Jeffrey Dahmer, in 2002 describing the deaths of the victims of serial killer Robert William Pickton, and in 2008 describing the killing of Tim McLean. In several cases, newspapers have refused to run the ads.

The group has also been criticized for aiming its message at young people. Your mother Kills Animals features a cartoon of a woman attacking a rabbit with a knife. To reduce milk consumption, it created the "Got Beer?" campaign, a parody of the dairy industry's series of Got Milk? ads, which featured celebrities with milk "mustaches" on their upper lips. When the mayor of New York, Rudy Giuliani, was diagnosed with prostate cancer in 2000, PETA ran a photograph of him with a white mustache and the words "Got prostate cancer?" to illustrate their claim that dairy products contribute to cancer, an ad that caused an outcry in the United States. After PETA placed ads in school newspapers linking milk to acne, obesity, heart disease, cancer, and strokes, Mothers Against Drunk Driving and college officials complained it encouraged underage drinking; the British Advertising Standards Authority asked that the ads be discontinued after complaints from interest groups such as The National Farmers' Unions.

In August 2011, it was announced that PETA will be launching a soft pornography website in the .xxx domain. PETA spokesperson Lindsay Rajt told the Huffington Post, "We try to use absolutely every outlet to stick up for animals," adding that "We are careful about what we do and wouldn't use nudity or some of our flashier tactics if we didn't know they worked." PETA also used nudity in its "Veggie Love" ad which it prepared for the Super Bowl, only to have it banned by the network. PETA's work has drawn the ire of some feminists who argue that the organization sacrifices women's rights to press its agenda. Lindsay Beyerstein criticized PETA saying "They're the ones drawing disturbing analogies between pornography, misogyny and animal cruelty."

PETA has approached cities to pressure them to change their names, including Fishkill, New York in 1996, Hamburg, New York in 2003, and Commerce City, Colorado in 2007.

PETA sometimes issues isolated statements or press releases, commenting on current events. After Lady Gaga wore a dress made of meat in 2010, PETA issued a statement objecting to the dress. After a fisherman in Florida was bitten by a shark in 2011, PETA proposed an advertisement showing a shark devouring a human, with the caption "Payback Is Hell, Go Vegan". The proposed ad drew criticism from relatives of the injured fisherman. After Minnesota dentist Walter Palmer admitted that he had killed Cecil the lion in Zimbabwe in 2015, PETA's president, Newkirk, issued a statement on behalf of PETA in which she said: "Hunting is a coward's pastime. If, as has been reported, this dentist and his guides lured Cecil out of the park with food so as to shoot him on private property, because shooting him in the park would have been illegal, he needs to be extradited, charged, and, preferably, hanged."

Undercover work
PETA sends its staff undercover into industries and other facilities that use animals to document the alleged abuse of animals. Investigators may spend many months as employees of a facility, making copies of documents and wearing hidden cameras.

1990s 
 In 1984, PETA produced a 26-minute film, Unnecessary Fuss, based on 60 hours of research video footage stolen by the Animal Liberation Front during a break-in at the University of Pennsylvania's head injury clinic. The footage showed experiments on the baboons with a hydraulic device intended to simulate whiplash. The publicity led to investigations, suspension of grant funding, the firing of a veterinarian, the closure of the research lab, and a period of probation for the university.
 In 1990, two PETA activists posed as employees of Carolina Biological, where they took pictures and video footage inside the company, alleging that cats were being mistreated. Following the release of PETA's tapes, the USDA conducted its own inspection and subsequently charged the company with seven violations of the Animal Welfare Act. Four years later, an administrative judge ruled that Carolina Biological had not committed any violations.
 In 1990, Bobby Berosini, a Las Vegas entertainer, lost his wildlife license as well as (on appeal) a later lawsuit against PETA, after PETA broadcast an undercover film of him slapping and punching orangutans in 1989.
 In 1997, PETA made a film from footage obtained by PETA member Michele Rokke, who went undercover to report on UK company Huntingdon Life Sciences, which aired on television. Huntingdon sued PETA, and PETA agreed to drop its campaign against Huntingdon.
 In 1999, a North Carolina grand jury indicted three workers at a hog farm after three-months of videotaping by a PETA operative while he was employed at the farm. The veterinarian who oversaw the farm said the video PETA had made from the footage was a distortion and was made by someone who "lied during his employment interview".

2000s
 In 2004, PETA released video tapes taken from eight-months of undercover filming in a West Virginia slaughterhouse that supplies chicken to the fast food industry. The recordings showed workers stomping on live chickens and throwing dozens against a wall. The parent corporation sent in their own inspectors and told the plant to clean up their act or lose their contract. Eleven employees were fired and the company introduced an anti-cruelty pledge for workers to sign.
 For 11 months PETA shot footage inside Covance's Virginia facility. Alleging that the footage showed primates being choked, hit, and denied medical attention, PETA sent the video and a 253-page complaint to the United States Department of Agriculture. The department investigated and Covance was fined $8,720. In 2005, Covance filed a lawsuit. "In exchange for not suing the infiltrator for illegally filming within Covance's lab, which was in breach of contract, PETA US handed over all the video footage to Covance and signed an agreement not to try and infiltrate Covance's laboratories for the next five years."
 In 2006, PETA filmed a trainer at Carson & Barnes Circus instructing others to beat the elephants to make them obey. A company spokesman said they stopped using electrical prods on animals after the video was released.
 In 2007, the owners of a chinchilla ranch in Michigan sued PETA after pretending in 2004 to be interested buyers and secretly filming them, creating a video "Nightmare on Chinchilla Farm". A judge dismissed the case, writing "Undercover investigations are one of the main ways our criminal justice system operates," and noted that investigative television shows "often conduct undercover investigations to reveal improper, unethical, or criminal behavior."
 In 2008, the famous Spanish singer Alaska collaborated with PETA in a joint campaign with AnimaNaturalis, posing nude in a picture to raise awareness for what she considers cruel activity, bullfighting.

2010s
 In 2013, PETA investigated angora rabbit farms in China and released video footage showing farmers ripping out the wool from live rabbits while they screamed. In 2015, Inditex announced they would discontinue their use of angora and donated their existing inventory to Syrian refugees. Seventy other retailers had also stopped selling angora wool since the release of PETA's graphic video footage.
 Between 2012 and 2014, PETA investigated sheep shearing sheds in the wool industry in Australia and the US. PETA sent reports and film footage to local authorities alleging that shearers had kicked and beat sheep, stomped on their heads, necks and legs, punched them with clippers, slammed them onto the floor, and sewed up cuts without pain relief. An American Wool Council spokesperson said "We do not condone or support the actions of anyone that results in the abuse of sheep either intentionally or unintentionally. Rough handling of animals that might result in the injury of a sheep is an unacceptable maneuver during the shearing process or anytime when sheep are handled."
 In 2014, PETA conducted an undercover investigation of the horse-racing industry, filming seven hours of footage that, as The New York Times reported, "showed mistreatment of the horses to be widespread and cavalier." Noted trainer Steve Asmussen and his top assistant trainer, Scott Blasi, were accused "of subjecting their horses to cruel and injurious treatments, administering drugs to them for nontherapeutic purposes, and having one of their jockeys use an electrical device to shock horses into running faster." The newspaper noted that this investigation "was PETA's first significant step into advocacy in the horse racing world." In November 2015, as a result of PETA's investigation, Asmussen was fined $10,000 by the New York State Gaming Commission. Robert Williams, executive director of the commission, said, "We recognize PETA for playing a role in bringing about changes necessary to make thoroughbred racing safer and fairer for all." By contrast, the Kentucky Horse Racing Commission, which also received PETA's allegations, found that Asmussen did not violate any of its rules. Asmussen remains under investigation by the U.S. Department of Labor for allegedly violating the Fair Labor Standards Act of 1938. After a thorough investigation, the Kentucky Horse Racing Commission did not bring any charges against Asmussen, stating the allegations "had neither a factual or scientific basis." While the fine from the New York State Gaming Commission was for a minor transgression, the most serious charges were deemed unfounded.
 In 2015, as The Washington Post reported, PETA investigated Sweet Stem Farm, a pig farm that supplies meat to Whole Foods. The resulting video footage "featured images of pigs, some allegedly sick and not given appropriate care, crowded into hot pens and roughly handled by employees," contradicting both the farm's own video self-portrait and Whole Foods' claims about "humane meat" (a term that PETA maintains is an oxymoron). The Post notes that "[i]n the wake of the PETA investigation, Whole Foods has removed the Sweet Stem video from its Web site." PETA subsequently filed a class-action lawsuit against Whole Foods, "alleging that the chain's claims about animal welfare amount to a 'sham.'" The lawsuit was dismissed by a federal magistrate, who ruled that the store's signage "amounted to permissible 'puffery'" and that "the statement that 'no cages' were used to raise broiler chickens was not misleading merely because Whole Foods failed to also disclose that poultry suppliers normally do not use cages in the first place."
 Other PETA investigations from around this time focused on crocodile and alligator farms in Texas and Zimbabwe, a monkey breeding facility in Florida, pigeon racing in Taiwan, ostrich slaughterhouses and tanneries in South Africa.
 CBS News reported in November 2016 that PETA had captured footage from restaurants that serve live octopus, shrimp, and other marine animals. The group's video showed "an octopus writhing as its limbs are severed by a chef at T Equals Fish, a Koreatown sushi restaurant in Los Angeles." PETA noted that octopuses "are considered among the most intelligent invertebrates" and "are capable of feeling pain just as a pig or rabbit would."
 In December 2016, PETA released video footage from an investigation at Texas A&M University's dog laboratory, which deliberately breeds dogs to contract muscular dystrophy. PETA claims that for "35 years, dogs have suffered in cruel muscular dystrophy experiments ... which haven't resulted in a cure or treatment for reversing the course of muscular dystrophy in humans." The Houston Press noted that "Texas A&M has been less than transparent about the research, and in some cases has denied that the dogs experience pain or discomfort." Among other efforts, PETA placed a billboard to oppose the ineffectual research on animals.
 Bio Corporation, a company that supplies dead animals for study and dissection, was the subject of a November 2017 PETA undercover investigation. It was claimed that video footage showed workers at the company's facility in Alexandria, Minnesota "drowning fully-conscious pigeons, injecting live crayfish with latex and claiming that they sometimes would freeze turtles to death." PETA brought 25 charges of cruelty to animals against the company. Drowning is not considered an acceptable form of euthanasia, according to the American Veterinary Medical Association, and its standards of humane euthanasia must be followed by companies certified by the United States Department of Agriculture such as Bio Corporation. On April 18, 2018, the case was dismissed and all charges dropped based on the Alexandria City Attorney's Office's assessment that the allegations of cruelty against either pigeons or crayfish were not sufficiently supported. Daniel Paden, PETA's director of evidence analysis, said that PETA is "reviewing its options to protect animals killed at Bio Corporation."
 In 2018, police raided a PetSmart store in Tennessee, after receiving video footage from PETA. Police confiscated six animals: a guinea pig, mice, and hamsters. PetSmart sued the ex-employee, Jenna Jordan, claiming she was a paid PETA operative who obtained employment at PetSmart stores in Arizona, Florida and Tennessee to obtain recordings which she provided to PETA. Jordan was accused of committing "animal neglect, theft of confidential information, unlawfully surveilled private conversations, and filing false reports with law enforcement under false pretenses in three states." In 2019, PetSmart added PETA as a defendant in the lawsuit.
 On May 1, 2018, PETA released an investigation of the mohair industry that led more than 80 retailers, including UNIQLO and Zappos, to drop products made with mohair. The video evidence "depicts goats being thrown around wood floors, dunked in poisonous cleaning solution or having their ears mutilated with pliers. ... [E]mployees are shown cutting goats' throats, breaking their necks, electrically shocking them and beheading them."

Ag-gag laws

Various U.S. states have passed ag-gag laws to prevent animal rights and animal welfare groups from conducting undercover investigations of operations that use animals. In response, PETA has been involved with other groups bringing lawsuits, citing First Amendment protections for free speech.
 In 2017, a federal judge ruled Utah's ag-gag law an unconstitutional violation of the First Amendment in a case brought against the state by PETA, ALDF and Amy Meyer, the director of the Utah Animal Rights Coalition.
 In 2018, Idaho's ag-gag law was struck down as unconstitutional in a case brought by ACLU-Idaho, the Animal Legal Defense Fund and PETA.
 In 2019, a federal judge struck down Iowa's 2012 ag-gag law in a case filed in 2017 by co-plaintiffs PETA, ALDF, ACLU of Iowa, Iowa Citizens for Community Improvement, Bailing Out Benji, and Center for Food Safety.
 In 2020, in the case of PETA et al v. Stein, Judge Schroeder struck four subsections of North Carolina's 2015 Property Protection Act, writing "the law is declared unconstitutional as applied to them in their exercise of speech." The plaintiffs included PETA, Center for Food Safety, ALDF, Farm Sanctuary, Food & Water Watch, Government Accountability Project, Farm Forward, and the ASPCA.

Euthanasia and PETA's shelter

PETA is a strong proponent of euthanasia. They oppose the no-kill movement, and rather than adoption programs, PETA prefers to aim for zero births through spaying and neutering. They recommend not breeding pit bulls, and support euthanasia in certain situations for animals in shelters, such as those being housed for long periods in cramped cages.

PETA calls their shelter in Norfolk, Virginia a "shelter of last resort", claiming they only receive old, sick, injured, badly behaved, and otherwise unadoptable animals. Operating as open admission, they take in animals no one else will, and consider death a merciful end. The consistently high percentage of animals euthanized at PETA's shelter has been controversial. In 2014, PETA euthanized over 80% of the shelter's animals and justified its euthanasia policies as "mercy killings".

In 2008, industry lobby group Center for Consumer Freedom (CCF) petitioned the Virginia Department of Agriculture and Consumer Services, requesting they reclassify PETA as a "slaughterhouse." CCF said in a news release that "[a]n official report filed by PETA itself shows that the animal rights group put to death nearly every dog, cat, and other pet it took in for adoption in 2006," with a kill rate of 97.4 percent. In 2012, VDACS said that it had in the past considered changing PETA's status from "shelter" to "euthanasia clinic," citing PETA's willingness to take in "anything that comes through the door, and other shelters won't do that." PETA acknowledged that it euthanized 95% of the animals at its shelter in 2011.

PETA's euthanasia practices have drawn intense scrutiny from lawmakers and criticism from animal rights activists for years. Fueled by public outrage from a 2014 incident where PETA workers took a pet Chihuahua from its porch and euthanized it the same day, the Virginia General Assembly passed Senate Bill 1381 in 2015 aimed at curtailing the operation of PETA's shelter. The bill defines a private animal shelter as "a facility operated for the purpose of finding permanent adoptive homes for animals." Though risking their legal access to euthanasia drugs, PETA has continued their practices. In the Chihuahua case, PETA paid a fine and settled a civil claim with the family three years later.

Legal proceedings
Two PETA employees were acquitted in 2007 of cruelty to animals after at least 80 euthanized animals were left in dumpsters in a shopping center in Ahoskie, North Carolina, over the course of a month in 2005; the two employees were seen leaving behind 18 dead animals, and 13 more were found inside their van. The animals had been euthanized after being removed from shelters in Northampton and Bertie counties. A Bertie County Deputy Sheriff stated that the two employees assured the Bertie Animal Shelter that "they were picking up the dogs to take them back to Norfolk where they would find them good homes." During the trial, Daphna Nachminovitch, the supervisor of PETA's Community Animal Project, said PETA began euthanizing animals in some rural North Carolina shelters after it found the shelters killing animals in ways PETA considers inhumane, including by shooting them. She also stated that the dumping of animals did not follow PETA's policy.

In November 2014, a resident of Accomack County, Virginia, produced video evidence that two workers in a van marked with a PETA logo had entered his property in a trailer park and taken his dog, who was then euthanized. He reported the incident to the police, who identified and charged two PETA workers, but the charges were later dropped by the commonwealth attorney on the grounds that it was not possible to prove criminal intent. The trailer park's manager had contacted PETA after a group of residents moved out, leaving their dogs behind, which is why the workers were on the property. The state later determined that PETA had violated state law by failing to ensure that the Chihuahua, who was not wearing a collar or tag, was properly identified and for failing to keep the dog alive for five days before euthanizing the animal. Citing a "severity of this lapse in judgment," the Virginia Department of Agriculture and Consumer Services issued PETA a first-ever violation and imposed a $500 fine. The contract worker who had taken the dog was dismissed by PETA.

In 2015, PETA sued British nature photographer David Slater in US court as a next friend for a wild macaque monkey, whom they named Naruto. PETA argued that the monkey was entitled to the copyright of a selfie photo it had taken while handling Slater's camera, and naming themselves to be the administrator of any copyright revenue. The monkey selfie copyright dispute was originally dismissed by Judge Orrick who wrote there is no indication that the Copyright Act extends to animals and a monkey could not own a copyright. PETA appealed, but the Court of Appeals found in favor of Slater saying that "PETA's real motivation in this case was to advance its own interests, not Naruto's." The decision cited Cetacean v. Bush (2004) that says animals can't sue unless Congress makes it clear in the statute that animals can sue, and added that "next friend" representation cannot be applied to animals. The court also wrote:

Video games

PETA has created a number of satirical video games with such names as How Green Is My Diet? and KKK or AKC? Spot the Difference. PETA uses these games to spread attention about animal rights and animal welfare and to advocate vegetarian and vegan diets. PETA's head of online marketing Joel Bartlett said "We've found that parody games are extremely popular. By connecting our message with something people are already interested in, we're able to create more buzz."

In 2017, Ingrid Newkirk sent a letter of complaint to Nintendo about their video game 1-2-Switch, during which players get to milk a cow. In her letter, Newkirk called the game "unrealistic" and wrote "you've taken all the cruelty out of milking". She also suggested that "instead of sugarcoating the subject, Nintendo switch to simulating activities in which no animals suffer."

In March 2020, PETA issued a "Vegan Guide to Animal Crossing" for the video game Animal Crossing: New Horizons.

Person of the year
Each year, PETA selects a "Person of the Year" who has helped advance the cause of animal rights. In 2015, Pope Francis was selected for his encouragement to treat animals with kindness and to respect the environment. In 2016, Mary Matalin was chosen for her fight for the humane treatment of farm animals and monkeys. In 2017, PETA chose a nonhuman recipient, Naruto, a monkey unaware of his role in a copyright case.

Positions

Direct action and the ALF

Newkirk is outspoken in her support of direct action, writing that no movement for social change has ever succeeded without what she calls the militarism component: "Thinkers may prepare revolutions, but bandits must carry them out." Newkirk is a strong supporter of direct action that removes animals from laboratories and other facilities: "When I hear of anyone walking into a lab and walking out with animals, my heart sings." Newkirk was quoted in 1999, "When you see the resistance to basic humane treatment and to the acknowledgment of animals' social needs, I find it small wonder that the laboratories aren't all burning to the ground. If I had more guts, I'd light a match."

Pet as a derogatory term 
PETA considers the word pet to be "derogatory and patronises the animal", and prefers the term "companion" or "companion animal". "Animals are not pets," Newkirk has said.

Hearing-ear and seeing-eye dogs
PETA supports hearing dog programs when animals are sourced from shelters and placed in homes, but opposes seeing-eye-dog programs "because the dogs are bred as if there are no equally intelligent dogs literally dying for homes in shelters, they are kept in harnesses almost 24/7".

Animal testing

PETA opposes animal testing—whether toxicity testing, basic or applied research, or for education and training—on both moral and practical grounds. Newkirk told the Vogue magazine in 1989 that even if animal testing resulted in a cure for AIDS, PETA would oppose it. The group also believes that it is wasteful, unreliable, and irrelevant to human health, because artificially induced diseases in animals are not identical to human diseases. They say that animal experiments are frequently redundant and lack accountability, oversight, and regulation. They promote alternatives, including embryonic stem cell research and in vitro cell research.

National Institute of Allergy and Infectious Diseases
The White Coat Waste Project, a group of activists that hold that taxpayers should not have to pay $20 billion every year for experiments on animals, highlighted that the National Institute of Allergy and Infectious Diseases provided $400,000 in taxpayer money to fund experiments in which 28 beagles were infected by disease-causing parasites. The White Coat Project found reports that said dogs taking part in the experiments were "vocalizing in pain" after being injected with foreign substances. Following public outcry, PETA made a call to action that all members of the National Institute of Health resign effective immediately and that there is a "need to find a new NIH director to replace the outgoing Francis Collins who will shut down research that violates the dignity of nonhuman animals."

Controversies

Purebred dogs
In 2009, PETA members dressed up in Ku Klux Klan robes and protested at the Westminster Kennel Club Dog Show where they passed out brochures implying the Klan and American Kennel Club have the same goal of "pure bloodlines". This protest was continued in the PETA video game KKK or AKC? Spot the Difference.

"Got Autism?" Campaign
In 2008 and in 2014, PETA conducted an advertising campaign linking milk with autism. Their "Got Autism?" campaign, a play on words mocking the milk industry's Got Milk? ad campaign that ran from 1993 to 2014, stated "Studies have shown a link between cow's milk and autism." PETA also claimed milk was strongly linked to cancer, Crohn's disease, and other diseases. In 2014, PETA's Executive Vice President confirmed their position, and additionally stated that dairy consumption contributes to asthma, chronic ear infection, constipation, iron deficiency, anemia, and cancer.

When pressed, PETA cited two scientific papers, one from 1995 and one from 2002 using very small samplings of children (36 and 20), and neither showed a correlation nor a causation between milk and autism. Newer studies from 2010 and 2014 have shown no association between dairy and behavior in autism. Despite having been corrected, a PETA representative said that they will still keep the information on their website "because we have heard from people who have said it contains helpful information. Many families have found that a dairy-free diet can help children with autism, and since the consumption of dairy products has been linked to asthma, constipation, recurrent ear infections, iron deficiency, anemia, and even cancer, dumping dairy is a healthy choice that everyone can make."

Steven Novella, a clinical neurologist and assistant professor at Yale University School of Medicine, wrote "This is clearly, in my opinion, a campaign of fear mongering based upon a gross distortion of the scientific evidence. The purpose is to advocate for a vegan diet, which fits [PETA's] ideological agenda. They are likely aware that it is easier to spread fears than to reassure with a careful analysis of the scientific evidence."

PETA's campaign has received backlash from the autism community. A 2008 PETA billboard was taken down by the Autistic Self Advocacy Network. In 2017, British food writer, journalist and hunger relief activist Jack Monroe, demanded PETA remove their recipes from their website "with immediate effect coz I wrote them with my autism". PETA removed their recipes, but did not remove the "Got Autism?" article from their website until 2021. It has been argued that the frowny face in the campaign image negatively stereotypes autistic people.

Steve Irwin controversy

PETA has been critical of Australian wildlife expert and zookeeper Steve Irwin. In 2006, when Irwin died, PETA Vice President Dan Mathews said Irwin had made a career out of antagonizing frightened wild animals. Australian Member of Parliament Bruce Scott was disgusted by the comments and said PETA should apologize to Irwin's family and the rest of Australia, and "Isn't it interesting ... how they [PETA] want to treat animals ethically, but cannot even think for a minute whether or not their outlandish comments are ethical towards their fellow human beings."

In 2019, PETA criticized Google for creating a slideshow Google Doodle of Steve Irwin posthumously honoring his 57th birthday. PETA started a Twitter campaign against Irwin, with several tweets criticizing Google for forwarding a dangerous message, and wrote that Irwin was killed while harassing a ray and that he forced animals to perform. A Washington Post editor wrote "PETA can add 'insulting a deceased cultural icon' to its infamous repertoire."

Anti-carnivore sex strike 
In 2022, Peta's German division called for a sex strike in which women would refrain from sexual activities with men who ate meat. When pressed on the ban, Laura Weyman-Jones (the Australian division's marketing manager) claimed that it was a "conversation starter," and not an actual request or threat. However, the company did not reverse its position that meat consumption was a form of toxic masculinity, harmful to the environment, increased male impotency, and should be sin-taxed at an additional 41%.

PETA India

PETA India was founded in 2000 and is based in Mumbai, India. It focuses on issues about animals in laboratories, the food industry, the leather trade, and entertainment."

PETA and NGO Animal Rahat, authorized by Animal Welfare Board of India, participated in a nine-month investigation of 16 circuses in India. After it was revealed that "animals used in circuses were subjected to chronic confinement, physical abuse, and psychological torment", AWBI in 2013 banned registration of elephants for performance.

PETA India put up billboards prior to a 2020 annual religious event Eid al-Adha where animals are ritualistically slaughtered. The billboards depicted goats with the words "I am a living being and not just meat. Change your view towards us and become a vegan." and "I am ME, Not Mutton. See the Individual. Go Vegan." Muslim clerics wanted the billboards taken down and claimed that it was hurtful to their religious sentiments.

In July 2020, PETA put up billboards saying "This Rakshabandhan, protect me: Go leather-free".

Domain name disputes
 
In February 1995, a parody website calling itself "People Eating Tasty Animals" registered the domain name "peta.org". PETA sued, claiming trademark violation, and won the suit in 2001; the domain is currently owned by PETA. While still engaged in legal proceedings over "peta.org", PETA themselves registered the domains "ringlingbrothers.com" and "voguemagazine.com", using the sites to accuse Ringling Brothers and Barnum & Bailey Circus and Vogue of animal cruelty. PETA later surrendered the domains under threat of similar legal action over trademark infringement.

Position within the animal rights movement

The failure of PETA to condemn the Animal Liberation Front is a common complaint by other animal rights activists and groups.

The more radical activists say the group has lost touch with its grass-roots members, is soft on the idea of animal rights, that it should stop the use of media stunts and nudity in its campaigning, and stop "hogging the spotlight at the expense of its allies in the movement".

Robert Garner of the University of Leicester has written that PETA has shaken up the animal rights movement, setting up new groups and radicalizing old ones. According to reviews at Philanthropedia, "PETA paved the way for other national organizations to delve into what used to be controversial issues and are now more mainstream concerns." Michael Specter considers PETA to be the radical that helps the more mainstream message to succeed.

Because of PETA's euthanasia rates at their "shelter of last resort", attorney Nathan Winograd, advocate for the No Kill movement, calls Newkirk of PETA "The Butcher of Norfolk".

Gary Francione, professor of law at Rutgers Law School and a proponent of abolitionism, says that PETA is not an animal rights group because of their willingness to work with industries that use animals to achieve incremental change. Francione says PETA trivializes the movement with their "Three Stooges" theory of animal rights, making the public think progress is underway when the changes are only cosmetic. "Their campaigns are selected more for media image than content." Francione has criticized PETA for having caused grassroots animal rights groups to close, groups that were essential for the survival of the animal rights movement, and rejects the centrality of corporate animal charities. Francione wrote that PETA initially set up independent chapters around the United States, but closed them in favor of a top-down, centralized organization, which not only consolidated decision-making power, but centralized donations. Now, local animal rights donations go to PETA, rather than to a local group.

See also
 Direct Action Everywhere
 European Vegetarian Union
 International Vegetarian Union
 Mercy for Animals
 Women and animal advocacy
 List of animal rights advocates
 List of animal rights groups
 Open rescue
 Veganism

Notes

References

Further reading
 Pence, Gregory. Classic Cases in Medical Ethics: Accounts of Cases That Have Shaped Medical Ethics. McGraw-Hill, 2007. 
 Workman, Dave P. Peta Files: The Dark Side of the Animal Rights Movement, Merril Press, 2003.

External links

 
 Guide to the People for the Ethical Treatment of Animals (PETA) Research Files 1980–2001

 
1980 establishments in the United States
Animal rights organizations
Anti-hunting organizations
Anti-vivisection organizations
Food politics
Organizations based in Norfolk, Virginia
Organizations established in 1980
Non-profit organizations based in Virginia